The 116th Massachusetts General Court, consisting of the Massachusetts Senate and the Massachusetts House of Representatives, met in 1895 during the governorship of Frederic T. Greenhalge. William M. Butler served as president of the Senate and George von Lengerke Meyer served as speaker of the House.

Notable legislation included an act related to "the Question of Granting Municipal Suffrage to Women."

Senators

Representatives

See also
 54th United States Congress
 List of Massachusetts General Courts

References

Further reading

External links
 
 

Political history of Massachusetts
Massachusetts legislative sessions
massachusetts
1895 in Massachusetts